FD Trinitron/WEGA is Sony's flat version of the Trinitron picture tube.  First introduced in 1998 on Sony's 32-inch and 36-inch televisions, this technology was also used in computer monitors bearing the Trinitron mark. The FD Trinitron used computer-controlled feedback systems to ensure sharp focus across a flat screen. The FD Trinitron reduces the amount of glare on the screen by reflecting much less ambient light than spherical or vertically flat CRTs. Flat screens also increase total image viewing angle and have less geometric distortion in comparison to curved screens. The FD Trinitron line featured key standard improvements over prior Trinitron designs including a finer pitch aperture grille, an electron gun with a greater focal length for corner focus, and an improved deflection yoke for color convergence.

Initially introduced on their 32 and 36 inch models in 1998, the new tubes were offered in a variety of resolutions for different uses. The basic WEGA models supported normal 480i signals, but a larger version offered 16:9 aspect ratios. The technology was quickly applied to the entire Trinitron range, from 13 to 40 inch. High resolution versions, Hi-Scan and Super Fine Pitch, were also produced. With the introduction of the FD Trinitron, Sony also introduced a new industrial style, leaving the charcoal colored sets introduced in the 1980s for a new silver styling.

In 2001, the FD Trinitron WEGA series had become the top selling television model in the United States. By 2003, over 40 million sets had been sold worldwide. As the television market shifted towards LCD technology, Sony eventually ended production of the Trinitron in Japan in 2004, and in the US in 2006. Sony would continue to sell the Trinitron in China, India, and regions of South America using tubes delivered from their Singapore plant. Worldwide production ended when Singapore ceased production in March 2008. The FD Trinitron series is one of the most sought after televisions among hobbyists of retro gaming.

FD Trinitron CRT variants

There were four primary variants of the FD Trinitron as used in televisions.

Super Fine Pitch refers to Sony's line of Trinitrons with high horizontal resolution and very fine aperture grille stripe pitch.  By the end of CRT's market dominance, only Sony and JVC had released such high-resolution CRT HDTVs to the non-professional consumer market. Hi-Scan is Sony's trademark for all Trinitron displays capable of processing a 1080i signal.  Super Fine Pitch tubes naturally fall into this category, as do some Sony Trinitron SDTVs that cannot physically resolve 1080 lines of vertical resolution, but the term Hi-Scan is commonly used to refer to Sony Trinitron HDTVs that do not feature an SFP tube. 16:9 Enhanced WEGA models differ from original WEGA models mainly in their ability to display anamorphic video content in its proper screen aspect ratio. FD Trinitron CRTs were available in several screen aspect ratios. 4:3 and 16:9 were used on the WEGA line of televisions. Many 4:3 monitors were produced as well as several models using an aspect ratio of 16:10 (such as the GDM-W900 and GDM-FW900). Competitors included Mitsubishi with their Diamondtron NF brand of flat aperture grille CRT displays, as used in certain computer monitors from Mitsubishi, NEC, and Apple.

List of Sony FD Trinitron/WEGA television models released in the United States
Listed in descending order according to size, release date, and product line.

See also 
XBR (Sony)

References 

Sony products
History of television
Television technology
Vacuum tube displays
Cathode ray tube